Theodor von Guérard (29 December 1863 – 21 July 1943) was a German jurist and politician of the Catholic Centre Party (German: Zentrum). He served as Minister of Justice and Minister of Transport of the Weimar Republic in the late 1920s and early 1930s.

Early life
von Guérard was born on 29 December 1863 at Koblenz, as the son of Bernhard von Guérard (1825–1882), Obergerichtsprokurator and his wife Eleonore (1829–1905) née Kehrmann. The family of his father had emigrated from Lorraine in the 18th century, thus the French name.

He studied jurisprudence and political sciences and then joined the Prussian civil service. From 1898 to 1905 he was Landrat at Mondschau, and then worked at the Oberpräsidium Koblenz, the administrative center of the Prussian Rhine Province.

He married Hedwig Mooren (1871–1950) at Düsseldorf in 1891. They had two sons and two daughters.

Political career
He was a member of the Reichstag from 1920 to 1930 for the Zentrum. Initially considered part of the conservative wing of the party, he was active on subjects such as the occupied territories as well as judicial and transport issues. Following the 1924 elections, he argued in favour of a coalition with the right-wing German National People's Party (DNVP). However, when he took up the position of executive vice-chair of his party's Reichstag group in May 1926, he became more left-wing oriented.

In December 1927, he became chairman of the Zentrum group and in this function helped bring about the demise of the third government of Wilhelm Marx. He then became Minister of Transport and for the Occupied Territories in the cabinet of Hermann Müller in 1928. During a reshuffle he became Minister of Justice. Although he was considered an opponent of Heinrich Brüning, Theodor von Guérard was again appointed Minister of Transport in 1930 under Brüning's chancellorship. On the behest of president Paul von Hindenburg, Theodor von Guérard left the government in autumn of 1931.

This ended his political career. He died in Ahaus (Westphalia) on 21 July 1943.

Works
 Die große Steuerreform des Jahres 1922, Schriftenreihe zur deutschen Politik, H. 4, 1922 (with H. Lange-Hegermann and P. Schulz-Gahmen) 
 Das besetzte Gebiet, in: Politisches Jahrbuch, ed. by G. Schreiber, 1925, 1926, 1927/28 (the last with Herm. Hofmann), 1926–28.

References

External links
 

1863 births
1943 deaths
Jurists from Rhineland-Palatinate
Justice ministers of Germany
Members of the Reichstag of the Weimar Republic
German untitled nobility